Hippotrema is a genus of bryozoans belonging to the family Hippoporidridae.

The species of this genus are found in Central America.

Species:

Hippotrema fissurata 
Hippotrema janthina

References

Bryozoan genera